Nicholas John Andersen (born 29 March 1969) is an English former professional footballer who played in the Football League for Lincoln City and Mansfield Town.

References

1969 births
Living people
English footballers
Association football defenders
English Football League players
Mansfield Town F.C. players
Lincoln City F.C. players
Nuneaton Borough F.C. players
Grantham Town F.C. players
Tamworth F.C. players
Bedworth United F.C. players
Leek Town F.C. players
Corby Town F.C. players